Mara Santangelo (born 28 June 1981) is a retired tennis player from Italy and Grand Slam champion in double.

Tennis career

Santangelo reached the fourth round at the 2004 Australian Open, defeating 16th-seeded Magüi Serna, Barbara Schett, and 19th-seeded Eleni Daniilidou—losing to eventual champion and world No. 1 Justine Henin after having been up 4–2 in the second set. She also won her first WTA title in 2006, defeating Jelena Kostanić in the final, her first victory on the WTA-level.

She took a set from top-seeded Amélie Mauresmo in the third round of the 2006 US Open, and led 2–0 in the deciding set, only to lose the next six games. She also defeated Anastasia Myskina in 2006, her first win over a top-20 player. She and her Italian teammates Francesca Schiavone, Flavia Pennetta, and Roberta Vinci beat the Belgian team 3–2 in the 2006 Fed Cup final. Justine Henin had to retire in the fifth and final match because of an injury in her right knee, which let Italy win their first Fed Cup trophy.

Despite holding match points in both matches, Santangelo lost to Agnieszka Radwańska and Dinara Safina in successive first rounds at Luxembourg and Stuttgart respectively, in three set matches. In Moscow, Santangelo lost in the first round to Iveta Benešová in another three-setter. In Linz, Santangelo defeated Alona Bondarenko; she lost to eventual semifinalist Nicole Vaidišová. At her final tournament of the year in Hasselt, Santangelo retired while 5–2 down against Michaëlla Krajicek in the first round. She ended the year ranked world No. 31, a new career high.

Santangelo was still recovering from injury when 2007 commenced. At her first tournament in Hobart, she defeated countrywoman Maria Elena Camerin in the first round, losing to Catalina Castaño in the second round. At the Australian Open, Santangelo drew then-world No. 81 eventual champion Serena Williams in the first round, losing in two sets. Santangelo reached her first quarterfinal of the year at the Tier IV Pattaya City tournament, losing to Sania Mirza in straight sets. At her very next tournament, the Tier III Bangalore, as the defending champion, Santangelo made the final for the second straight year, where she lost to Yaroslava Shvedova in the final.

In Doha during the second round, Santangelo faced fellow countrywoman Francesca Schiavone, and led 6–4, 6–6(6–5), but lost 4–6, 7–6, 1–0 retired after dropping a match point. She rebounded during her next tournament, however, in Key Biscayne, defeating Jelena Janković in the third round in three sets – which was the first top 10 victory of her career. She lost in the round of 16 to Anna Chakvetadze. Reaching the fourth round of Key Biscayne has thus far been the best showing of Santangelo's in a high-tier event.

During the clay court season, Santangelo defeated Nadia Petrova in the second round of Warsaw, for her second career top-10 victory, reaching her third quarterfinal of the year. She lost to eventual champion Henin. At the French Open, in singles, Santangelo reached the third round, losing to eventual champion Henin. For doubles, however, partnering Alicia Molik, she won the championship, winning her first Grand Slam title. The victory was her fourth title in doubles for the year, with four different partners at each championship.

In 2007 Wimbledon Championships, Santangelo was defeated in round three by the defending champion and fourth-seeded, Amélie Mauresmo, in 57 minutes. Santangelo took part in the 2007 Fed Cup final, where she was defeated by Svetlana Kuznetsova in the second rubber and by Elena Vesnina in the fourth rubber; Italy unsuccessfully defended its title and Russia won the trophy with a 4–0 score. Santangelo had to miss the warm-ups for the Australian Open and the Australian Open itself in 2008 because of a troublesome left foot injury. She also had to miss the Paris Indoors event and the Bangalore Open event, where she has previously won a WTA title and been a runner-up.

Santangelo returned from eight-month left foot injury lay-off in May; she reached the second round twice (including the 2008 Wimbledon Championships) and she won two ITF tournaments, Biella and Ortisei. At the Beijing Olympics, she was defeated by Dinara Safina in the first round.

In 2009, once again plagued by her foot injury, Santangelo won three doubles tournaments, all of them partnering Nathalie Dechy: ASB Classic, where they defeated Nuria Llagostera Vives and Arantxa Parra Santonja, the Monterrey Open with a two-sets win over Iveta Benešová and Barbora Záhlavová-Strýcová and, finally, Strasbourg, defeating Claire Feuerstein and Stéphanie Foretz with a 6–0, 6–1 score. On 6 September, partnering Laura Olivieri, she won the 2009 European Beach Tennis Championships with a straight-sets win over the defending champions, Simona Briganti and Rossella Stefanelli.

In May 2010, Santangelo announced her decision to compete in doubles events only, citing her recurrent left foot injury as the main cause that persuaded her to renounce to play singles matches. On 28 January 2011, she declared her retirement from professional tennis due to recurring injuries with her left foot.

Personal life
Santangelo was born in Latina, but grew up in the Fiemme Valley in Trentino. She started playing tennis at the age of 6. Her mother, Patrizia, died in a car accident in 1997, when she was sixteen.

Santangelo is a Catholic. In 2010, she went on a pilgrimage to Our Lady of Medjugorje, and has been vocal about her faith since then. Santangelo has written an autobiography, Te lo prometto (I promise you), based on her tennis career and spiritual life.

Grand Slam finals

Doubles: 1 (1–0)

WTA career finals

Singles: 2 (1–1)

Doubles: 12 (9–3)

ITF finals

Singles (8–4)

Doubles (14–5)

Grand Slam performance timelines

Singles

Doubles

Head-to-head record against top players
Players who have been ranked world No. 1 are in boldface.

Martina Hingis 0–1
Nadia Petrova 1–2
Serena Williams 0–2
Dinara Safina 0–3
Elena Dementieva 0–2
Jelena Janković 1–3
Nicole Vaidišová 1–1
Lindsay Davenport 0–1
Elena Vesnina 1–1
Flavia Pennetta 0–3
Ana Ivanovic 0–2
Agnieszka Radwańska 1–1

References

External links
 
 
 
 Mara Santangelo Official website

1981 births
Living people
Italian female tennis players
Olympic tennis players of Italy
Sportspeople from the Province of Latina
Italian Roman Catholics
Tennis players at the 2008 Summer Olympics
Grand Slam (tennis) champions in women's doubles
French Open champions